The 1926 Georgia Normal Blue Tide football team represented Georgia Normal School—now known as Georgia Southern University—during the 1926 college football season. The team was coached by E. G. Cromartie, in his third season.

Schedule

References

Georgia Normal
Georgia Southern Eagles football seasons
Georgia Normal Blue Tide football